Rajinder Khanna is the former chief of the Research and Analysis Wing, the external intelligence agency of India. He joined the Indian Police Service (IPS) in 1978 and was allotted to Odisha cadre. From 1979 to 1985, he held several important posts including Superintendent of Police in Puri and Ganjam districts in Odisha. As the Superintendent of Police in Puri, he received a number of commendations from the Chief Minister for eradicating dacoity in the district.

Khanna is considered as the founder and driving force of the counter-terrorism unit in R&AW, he is said to be an expert on terrorism.

He has been appointed as one of the three Deputy National Security Advisors of India, other two being retired IFS officer Pankaj Saran and retired IPS officer Dattatray Padsalgikar.

Early career 
Rajinder Khanna is a graduate in economics (Hons.) from Hans Raj College, Delhi University and he did his master's degree in Business Administration (MBA) from the prestigious Faculty of Management Studies (FMS), Delhi University in 1978.

Achievements 
During the foundation course for civil services at Lal Bahadur Shastri Academy of Administration (LBSNAA), Mussoorie, he was awarded the Director's silver medal for securing the highest marks in Economics.

References

Indian police officers
Spymasters
Indian spies
Living people
People of the Research and Analysis Wing
Year of birth missing (living people)